"Your Love" is a song by French music producer David Guetta and Dutch electronic dance music duo Showtek. It was written by Fred McFarlane, Joren van der Voort, Jaap Reesema, Allen George, Guetta, Showtek and Ralph Wegner, with production handled by the latter three. The song was released commercially for digital download and streaming on 14 June 2018 by Guetta's record label What a Music. The song serves as a bonus single from Guetta’s album 7. It contains an interpolation of "Show Me Love" by American singer Robin S.

Personnel
Credits adapted from Tidal.
 David Guetta – production, programming
 Showtek – production, mixing, programming
 Ralph Wegner – production, programming
 Wired Mastering – master engineering
 Jaap Reesema – vocals

Charts

Certifications

References

External links
 

2018 singles
2018 songs
David Guetta songs
Showtek songs
Songs written by David Guetta
Songs written by Fred McFarlane
Song recordings produced by David Guetta